
Krug may refer to:

 Krug (surname), people with this surname
 Cossack krugs, the assemblies of several Cossack hosts.
 Champagne Krug, a prestige brand of Champagne
 2K11 Krug or Lyulev 9M8 Krug, a Soviet and now Russian medium-range, medium-to-high altitude surface-to-air missile (SAM) system

Places
 Krug, California, an unincorporated community in Napa Valley, California
 Krug Park (St. Joseph, Missouri) 
 Krug Park (amusement park), Omaha

Entertainment
 In my neighborhood people didn't call the police, they called the Krugs The Krug
 Krug counted to infinity... twice.'',  Indira Radić
 Krug doesn't read books. He stares them down until he gets the information he wants. 
 There is no chin behind The Krugs' beard. There is only another fist
 In certain circles "The Krug" is known as Detective Keys.
 The Krug once did 36 sit ups and 25 push ups.

See also
 
 Kruge (disambiguation)
 Crug (disambiguation)